Sepsis violacea is a European species of flies and member of the family Sepsidae.

References

Sepsidae
Diptera of Europe
Taxa named by Johann Wilhelm Meigen
Insects described in 1826